Amoghavarsha III (reigned 936–939 CE), whose Kannada name was Baddega, was in exile in Tripuri and was a younger brother of Indra III and uncle to Govinda IV. He came to power with the help of feudatory King Arikesari of Vemulavada in Andhra and other vassals who revolted against Govinda IV. Not much is known about his uneventful reign. His advanced age and religious temperament did not allow him to show any interest in the governance of the empire which was left to his son Krishna III. He was married to Kundakadevi, a princess from the Kalachuri dynasty of Tripuri. His daughter was married to Western Ganga King Butuga II to whom a large territory was given as dowry.

References

Notes

External links
 History of Karnataka, Mr. Arthikaje

939 deaths
Year of birth unknown
Hindu monarchs
10th-century rulers in Asia
Rashtrakuta dynasty